Maboké is a dish in Centrafrican cuisine of Central African Republic. It is a fish dish, with roasted spices, wrapped in cassava or banana leaf. It is also eaten in other part of African cuisine in other parts of Africa, like the Democratic Republic of The Congo which uses many species of tropical fish from the Congo River. It is sometimes served with fried plantains and rice.

References

Central African Republic cuisine